Inner Monologue Part 1 is the fourth extended play by American singer and songwriter Julia Michaels, released on January 24, 2019, through Republic Records. It follows her 2017 EP Nervous System. The EP features six songs, including collaborations with Selena Gomez and Niall Horan. Michaels went on a tour in the second quarter of 2019 in support of the EP.

Music
The EP features songs with "a syncopated rhythm, a jumble of words, negative space, and [...] undeniable hooks". "Anxiety" features lyrics about mental health "over snaps and a razor-sharp guitar"; Paper magazine commented that it has "an upbeat acoustic lick and earworm of a melody" and "the dynamic duo trading cleverly arranged verses about the often-isolating experience of anxiety and depression". Upon its release, Gomez said on Instagram: "This song is really close to my heart as I've experienced anxiety and I know a lot of my friends do too."

"Into You" features "stadium echoes, booms and a strobing vibe that strikes just left of Lorde", while third track "Happy" includes Michaels "strained-voice and desperate, break[ing] out of beat to reflect on how writing lovesick songs might affect her life as a whole".

Release
Michaels released the EP a day earlier than originally planned, having first announced it would be released on January 25, 2019.

Critical reception
Inner Monologue Part 1, received mostly mixed to positive reviews. While many found a strong interest and strength in the opening single “Anxiety”, Ft. Selena Gomez, others found weakness in some other tracks.
Mike Nied of Idolator commented that the EP "offers another glimpse into the songwriter-turned-superstar's inner workings" and that it is "bookended by a pair of must-hear duets". Nied stated that "What a Time" "mourns the end of a relationship", and Billboard called "Anxiety" "poignant".

Promotion
The EP was promoted with the release of four music videos; "What a Time" on February 7, "Happy" on February 28 "Deep" on March 6 and "Apple" on March 13.

Michaels embarked on the Inner Monologue Tour in 2019. This is her first headlining tour. The tour started  on March 4, 2019 at the House of Blues at Disney Springs in Orlando, FL.

Track listing
Credits adapted from Tidal.

Charts

References

2019 EPs
Julia Michaels albums